Tina Kim (born January 3, 1970 in Seoul, South Korea) is a Korean-American stand-up comedian. She currently books and produces her own shows, along with managing her own website, on which she sells CDs and DVDs of her past shows, as well as unique shirts. She also maintains a YouTube account where she puts excerpts of her performances.
Her comedy is mainly based on her life experiences, including being an Asian woman in the United States, the horrors of the internet, crazy dating stories, and her desire to be "bootylicious".

She appeared on The Greg Behrendt Show to discuss her dating difficulties; as revealed on the show. One of her comedic influences, Margaret Cho, called the show to express similar feelings and lend an understanding ear (she is also an old friend of the host and fellow stand-up comedian Greg Behrendt).

Tina appeared on Comics Unleashed June 2007, VH-1, Last Comic Standing season one, Baggage, 10 things I hate about me, host of Asian American on PBS and Comedy TV.

Tina is also an avid group fitness enthusiast and teaches classes around the San Fernando Valley.  She is the owner of Tina's Indoor Cycling where you cycle to themed classes and as well as take her bodyworks classes focused on specific areas.  All of these classes combine themes, comedy, working in the zone & laughter.  One of her cycling classes is called "The S&M ride. You will be degraded."

Kim has also gained notoriety on TikTok with her account @kdramalogic. Where she discusses topics such as K-Pop and K-Dramas.

Sources

External links
Tina Kim's official website
Tina Kim's Facebook page
Tina's Indoor cycling page
Tina Kim on YouTube
Tina Kim on TikTok

American people of Korean descent
Living people
1970 births
American women comedians
21st-century American comedians
21st-century American women